Robert Guy Griffin (born 1942) is a Professor of Chemistry  and director of the Francis Bitter Magnet Laboratory at Massachusetts Institute of Technology (MIT). He is known for his work in nuclear magnetic resonance (NMR) and developing high-field dynamic nuclear polarisation (DNP) for the study of biological solids. He has contributed many different methods and approaches now widely used in solid-state NMR spectroscopy, in particular in context of magic-angle-spinning NMR. For example, this extends to methods for resolution enhancement via heteronuclear decoupling, as well as techniques for polarisation transfer between nuclei (to enable structure determination of crystallised and aggregated proteins). 

He was awarded the ISMAR (International Society of Magnetic Resonance ) Prize in 2010  and the Günther Laukien Prize for NMR research in 2007. In 2018, he received the Bijvoet Medal of the Bijvoet Center for Biomolecular Research of Utrecht University

In 2021, he was elected member of the U. S. National Academy of Sciences.

References

1942 births
Living people
21st-century American chemists
Fellows of the American Academy of Arts and Sciences
Members of the United States National Academy of Sciences
Bijvoet Medal recipients